The Diggings was a colloquial term for the gold rush locations in Australia and the United States beginning in the 1850s. Gold miners - the diggers - would describe their journey "to the diggings" and say they were "at (or on) the diggings." Because of the speed at which a "rush" to a particular location might occur, or at which it might be abandoned at news of another rush, the term diggings tended to apply to general areas.

In Victoria, some of the major diggings were Ballarat, Bendigo (Sandhurst), Mount Alexander or Forest Creek, Ovens Valley and Omeo.

In the US the major gold rushes were the California gold rush, the Colorado gold rush and the Alaska gold rush.

As surface gold diminished and mining companies replaced individual diggers, the term "diggings" dropped out of use.

The miners used a shovel, a pan, a cradle or sluice box and other tools to dig for gold.

Australian gold rushes